"Kauas pois" is a song by a Finnish reggae artist Raappana. It was released as a single on 2 November 2012 and served as the first single from his third studio album Tuuliajolla. The accompanying music video was uploaded to YouTube on 25 October 2012.

Chart performance 

"Kauas pois" peaked at number four on the Official Finnish Download Chart and at number 14 on the Finnish Singles Chart.

References

Raappana (musician) songs
2012 singles
2012 songs